Pishaj is a village and a former municipality in the Elbasan County, central Albania. At the 2015 local government reform it became a subdivision of the municipality Gramsh. The population at the 2011 census was 4,906.

References

Cerunje

Former municipalities in Elbasan County
Administrative units of Gramsh, Elbasan
Villages in Elbasan County